Wally McNamee (1932–2017) was an American photojournalist. Over his career, which included work for The Washington Post and Newsweek, he covered 10 United States Presidents, the Korean and Vietnam Wars, and the Olympics. He was named the White House News Photographers' Association's Photographer of the Year four times (1957, 1968, 1974, and 1983) and received National Press Photographers Association's highest honor, the Sprague Memorial Award, in 2005. His son, Win, is also a photojournalist.

References 

1932 births
2017 deaths
American photojournalists
Photographers from Virginia
The Washington Post people
Newsweek people
20th-century American journalists
American male journalists